Yahadian is a Papuan language of the Bird's Head Peninsula of Southwest Papua. It is spoken in Yahadian village, Kais District, South Sorong Regency.

Yahadian is closest to Konda, with which it is 60% similar lexically.

Pronouns
De Vries (2004:147) reports the following pronouns for Yahadian.

External links 
 Paradisec has an open access collection from Bert Voorhoeve that includes Yahadian language materials

References

 de Vries, Lourens. 2004. A Short Grammar of Inanwatan: An endangered language of the Bird's Head of Papua, Indonesia. (Pacific Linguistics 560). Canberra: Australian National University.

Konda–Yahadian languages